, also known by his Chinese style name , was a bureaucrat of Ryukyu Kingdom.

Seichin was born to an aristocrat family, Mō-uji Zakimi Dunchi, and he was also the seventh head of this family. In 1807, he was granted Yuntanza magiri (modern Yomitan) as his hereditary fief.

He served as a member of sanshikan from 1826 to 1836.

References

1781 births
1837 deaths
Ueekata
Sanshikan
People of the Ryukyu Kingdom
18th-century Ryukyuan people
19th-century Ryukyuan people